The 2016–17 season was Cambridge United's 104th season in their history, their 38th in the Football League and their third consecutive season in League Two. Along with League Two, the club also participated in the FA Cup, EFL Cup and EFL Trophy.

The season covers the period from 1 July 2016 to 30 June 2017.

Squad

Squad details at start of season

* League appearances and goals for the club as of beginning of 2016–17 season.† Date of first team debut

Transfers in

Transfers out

Loans in

Loans out

Squad statistics this season

Suspensions

Competitions

Pre-season friendlies

League Two

League table

Results summary

Results by matchday

Matches
On 22 June 2016, the fixtures for the forthcoming season were announced.

August

September

October

November

December

January

February

March

April

May

FA Cup

On 15 October 2016, in the first round draw for the FA Cup Cambridge United were drawn at home against Dover Athletic.

EFL Cup

On 22 June 2016, in the first round draw for the EFL Cup Cambridge United were drawn at home against Sheffield Wednesday.

EFL Trophy

On 27 July 2016 the draw for the group stages of the EFL Trophy was made. Cambridge United were drawn in Northern Group G along with Middlesbrough academy, Scunthorpe United and Shrewsbury Town.

References

Cambridge United F.C. seasons
Cambridge United